John Morley (died 14 November 1587) was an English politician who sat in the House of Commons from 1584 to 1586.

He was an official in the Star Chamber from 7 July 1565. By 1568 he was joint surveyor of customs on cloth and wines. He became engrosser of the great roll and Clerk of the Pipe in July 1579. His offices made him wealthy and he purchased lands at Halnaker, Sussex. In 1584, he was elected Member of Parliament for Wycombe. He was elected MP for St Ives in 1586.

Morley married Elizabeth Wotton, daughter of Edward Wotton, MD. They had three sons including John who was also an MP.

References

Year of birth missing
1587 deaths
Members of the pre-1707 English Parliament for constituencies in Cornwall
People from the Borough of St Edmundsbury
English MPs 1584–1585
English MPs 1586–1587